Get a Horse! is a 2013 American animated comedy short film produced by Walt Disney Animation Studios and directed by Lauren MacMullan. Combining black-and-white hand-drawn animation and color computer animation, the short features the characters of the late 1920s Mickey Mouse cartoons.

The film features archival recordings of Walt Disney in his posthumous role as Mickey Mouse. ("Goodbye, goodbye, little feller!" is an uncredited  line by Jimmy MacDonald sourced from an archival recording.) Disney's voice is also heard as Minnie Mouse in one  instance (crying out "Help! Help! Help!"), though he is uncredited in that role.

It is the first original Mickey Mouse theatrical animated short since Runaway Brain (1995), and the first appearance of Oswald the Lucky Rabbit in a Disney animated production in 75 years.

Plot

Mickey Mouse walks from his house and spots Horace Horsecollar pulling a hay wagon with all his friends playing music. He hops on the wagon and helps up Minnie Mouse and Clarabelle Cow onto the wagon. Just then, Peg-Leg Pete shows up in his jalopy as his horn bellows in a high-pitched voice, "Make way for the future!". Pete spots Minnie and gives her a flirty gaze, only for Mickey to put Clarabelle in the gaze in Minnie's place, much to Pete's disgust and horror. Angry at being pranked, Pete kidnaps Minnie and rams his car into the wagon, sending Mickey and Horace flying toward the screen. Seeing Mickey and Horace bounce off the fabric, Pete hurls them even harder into the screen until they burst from their two-dimensional, black and white world to the three-dimensional, modern movie theater in full color. As Pete taunts Mickey from inside the screen and closes the hole in the screen, Mickey tries to get back into his world, pulling back the curtains to reveal a wider screen.

Horace then walks onto the stage wearing a Captain America T-shirt and sunglasses, as well as carrying items such as an iPhone, a box of Milk Duds, a soft drink, and a tub of popcorn. Mickey decides to use Horace as a mock biplane to fly around the theater and fire at Pete with the Milk Duds. When they crash-land onto the stage, Mickey immediately sees and finds the iPhone Horace brought onto the stage, so he calls Pete on his candlestick phone and Horace sprays foam from a fire extinguisher into the stolen phone and out from Pete's phone after he answers it.

Pete's car then lands in a frozen lake and the screen fills with water, giving Mickey the idea to poke a hole in the screen with his tail and let the water leak out, causing Pete, Minnie and the other cartoon animals to flood out onto the stage. Mickey and Minnie's reunion is short-lived, however, as Pete gives chase to the characters in and out of the screen until he grabs Minnie again, hits Mickey with his car onto a support beam and nails the screen shut. Horace and the others work together to swing from the beam and try to break through the screen like a wrecking ball, but end up flipping the screen upside-down, causing Pete to fall from the ground.

Mickey and the others flip it again, and Pete lands on the ground, with his car crashing down on him. Getting an idea, Minnie encourages Mickey to flip the screen again, this time having Pete land on a cactus, which sets off a chain of events. First, Pete gets an electrical shock on some telephone cables, then his face gets hit by all the steps on a ladder, lands face first in the mud, and gets his rear end poked on a pitchfork and falls onto a seesaw, where he gets hit on the head by numerous tools. Then one of the tools, a sledgehammer, rams the pitchfork deeper into his rear end. Finally, the sledgehammer falls on the opposite side of the seesaw, where Pete is launched, also making the pitchfork fly off of his rear, and lands face-first in his car.

Mickey, Minnie, and Horace begin to laugh hysterically at Pete's pain. Suddenly, Horace's hand gets stuck behind the screen due to him pounding the screen. Mickey tries to pull him out, but only succeeds by spinning the screen horizontally like a flip-book. To Mickey's realization, it rewinds the scene. Seeing this as an opportunity, Mickey and Horace begin spinning the screen until Pete is completely dazed and knocked out.

Minnie then drives Pete's car with Pete in tow and completely tears the screen down, revealing the black-and-white world in color and CGI. With Pete still knocked out, Mickey and his friends enter their world again and dance for a moment, while Oswald the Lucky Rabbit briefly peeks out from the side of the screen. The horn that was on Pete's car tells an unconscious Pete, "Ah, get a horse!", before Mickey and his friends bring down a new screen, then Mickey waves goodbye to Pete and the audience, and he and Minnie are about to kiss, but instead kiss Horace on the cheeks, causing him to blush. As the iris closes, Pete, who has woken up by now, tries to get back in through the screen, but gets his head (and his body) stuck. Seconds later, the flap on Pete's pants open up to reveal the phrase "THE END" and Pete bellows "HEY!" as the screen cuts to the credits. After the credits, the 2011 version of the Walt Disney Pictures logo is in black-and-white, and Clarabelle jumps over the castle, making the arch with her milk.

Cast
 Walt Disney and Bret Iwan as Mickey Mouse
 Walt Disney, Marcellite Garner and Russi Taylor as Minnie Mouse
 Billy Bletcher  and Will Ryan as Peg Leg Pete

Additional voices
 Bob Bergen
 Paul Briggs
 Jess Harnell
 Mona Marshall
 Terri Douglas
 Danya Joseph
 Nicole Mitchell
 Raymond S. Persi as Car Horn

Production
Get a Horse! was conceived and directed by Lauren MacMullan, who became the first woman to solo direct a Disney animated film. She started working on the short after Wreck-It Ralph director, Rich Moore, told her that Disney was looking for some Mickey Mouse ideas for television. Being fond of the earliest Mickey Mouse shorts, mostly because of their simplicity and freshness, she opted for a style resembling the 1920s "rubber hose" animation style prevalent at the time. Produced in a year and 6 months, its hand-drawn animation was supervised by Eric Goldberg, and its computer animation by Adam Green. To achieve the 1928 look, aging and blur filters were added to the image, while for the CG part, they created new models, faithful to the character designs of 1928. The look of Pete's clothing and car were inspired by his design in the 1929 short The Barn Dance.

Originally temporary, the production team incorporated archival recordings of Walt Disney's Mickey Mouse voice from 1928 to 1947, and spliced it into the character's dialogue. However, they did not find recordings of the word "red", so the crew took three sounds, a "rrr", a "ehh", and a "duh" from Disney's recordings and spliced them together.

Get a Horse! would become the last short film where Minnie Mouse would be voiced by Russi Taylor, almost six years before her passing on July 26, 2019.

Release
Get a Horse! premiered June 11, 2013 at the Annecy International Animated Film Festival in Annecy, France. It made its United States premiere on August 9, 2013, at the D23 Expo in Anaheim, California, and theatrically accompanied Walt Disney Animation Studios' Frozen, which was released on November 27, 2013.

Since 2016, Get a Horse! is presented as part of the Disney-Pixar Short Film Festival attraction at Disney's Epcot theme park in Orlando, Florida, where it is shown in digital 3-D along with two Pixar short films. It is also part of the Walt Disney Animation Studios’ Short Film Collection.

Home media
Get a Horse! made its home debut on the Blu-ray, 3D Blu-ray and DVD releases of Frozen on March 18, 2014. It was later released on the Walt Disney Animation Studios Short Films Collection Blu-ray on August 18, 2015. The short was re-released on Blu-ray/DVD/Digital on the Celebrating Mickey compilation, released October 23, 2018. Celebrating Mickey was reissued in 2021 as part of the U.S. Disney Movie Club exclusive The Best of Mickey Collection along with Fantasia and Fantasia 2000 (Blu-ray/DVD/Digital).

Streaming
Get a Horse! was available on Netflix in North America on October 25, 2015, released in the Walt Disney Animation Studios Short Films Collection, which also included Frozen Fever and Paperman, as one film title on the service. The title was removed from Netflix on October 25, 2021, five years after it was added.

The short film, and most of the others that were released on Netflix, were made available to stream individually, rather than one single collection, on Disney+ on November 12, 2021 for the first Disney+ Day.

Critical response
Todd McCarthy of The Hollywood Reporter lauded the short film as "one of the wittiest and most inventive animated shorts in a long time". He particularly points out that the film "begins as an early black-and-white Mickey Mouse cartoon but then bursts its boundaries into color and 3D in marvelously antic ways that call to mind the stepping-off-the-screen techniques of Buster Keaton's Sherlock Jr. and Woody Allen's The Purple Rose of Cairo. It's a total winner." Scott Foundas of Variety agreed, labeling the film as "utterly dazzling". Drew McWeeny of HitFix lauded it as "the perfect companion piece" and "enormously entertaining". He continues on that "Filmmaker Lauren MacMullan perfectly nails the look and feel of the early days of the Disney studio, and it is the first time I have ever laughed out loud at Mickey Mouse. It's an inventive and technically precise short, and it also celebrates and deconstructs Disney's animated history in a very fun way."

See also
 List of Mickey Mouse films and appearances

References

External links
  at Walt Disney Animation Studios
  at Disney.com
 
 

2013 films
2013 3D films
2013 animated films
Films set in a movie theatre
2010s Disney animated short films
Mickey Mouse short films
American black-and-white films
Animated films about horses
American slapstick comedy films
Oswald the Lucky Rabbit cartoons
Best Animated Short Subject Annie Award winners
Self-reflexive films
Films scored by Mark Watters
3D animated short films
2013 short films
2010s English-language films